Luís Mendes mostly known for his stage name Dengaz (born August 9, 1984) is a Portuguese rapper and hip-hop musician.

Discography

Albums

Singles

Notes 

Living people
1984 births
Portuguese rappers
21st-century Portuguese male singers
Portuguese male singer-songwriters
People from Cascais